Gotul may refer to:
Gotul, the dormitory institution among the Gondi people
Quytul (disambiguation)